Almirante Riveros (FF-18) is a  of the Chilean Navy. Built by the shipyard Koninklijke Schelde Groep in Vlissingen, the ship was previously in use by the Royal Netherlands Navy as HNLMS Tjerk Hiddes until 2006.

Dutch service 
HNLMS Tjerk Hiddes was one of six s that were built at the Koninklijke Schelde Groep in Vlissingen. The keel laying took place on 28 October 1986 and the launching on 9 December 1989. The ship was put into service on 26 February 1993.

In June 1994 the ship participated in the BALTOPS 94 naval exercise with vessels from several other navies.

During her time with the Dutch navy she operated in the Atlantic ocean and the Caribbean Sea and took part in Operation Enduring Freedom around the Arabian Peninsula and Operation Active Endeavour in Mediterranean Sea.

On 3 February 2006 the vessel was decommissioned and sold to the Chilean Navy.

Chilean service 
The ship was put into service in April 2007 where the ship was renamed Almirante Riveros.{

In November 2015 the ship participated in Exercise UNITAS Atlantic 2015 off the coast of Brazil, with vessels from several other navies.

Footnotes

External links 
 Nederlandse-marine.nl 
 mindef.nl

1989 ships
Karel Doorman-class frigates
Karel Doorman-class frigates of the Chilean Navy